Hypsoblennius digueti is a species of combtooth blenny found in the east-central Pacific ocean, around the Gulf of California. Some authors regard this taxon as a junior synonym of Hypsoblennius gentilis.

References

digueti
Fish described in 1943